Sonatala may refer to:
Sonatala Upazila, an upazila in Bogura District, Rajshahi Division, Bangladesh
Sonatala, Malda, a census town in West Bengal, India